Highway 918 is a provincial highway in the north-west and far north regions of the Canadian province of Saskatchewan. It runs from Highway 165 near Beauval to Patuanak. Highway 918 is about 92 km (57 mi) long.

See also 
Roads in Saskatchewan
Transportation in Saskatchewan

References 

918